Noreen, or BID 590, was an off-line one-time tape cipher machine of British origin.

Usage 
As well as being used by the United Kingdom, Noreen was used by Canada.  It was widely used in diplomatic stations.  According to the display note on a surviving unit publicly displayed at Bletchley Park in the United Kingdom, the system was predominantly used "by the foreign office in British embassies overseas where the electricity supply was unreliable."

Usage lasted from the mid-1960s through 1990.

Compatibility 
It was completely compatible with Rockex.

Power Supply 

The units were powered by two batteries of six and twelve volts respectively, though some were known to have been powered by mains.

Other uses of the name "Noreen" 

 Noreen was the name of a wooden dragger that was acquired by the U.S. Navy during World War II and converted into the minesweeper USS Heath Hen (AMc-6).
 Noreen is a common name in the Americas, Ireland, Scotland, and the Middle East. Also spelt Naureen, Noirin and Nowrin (نورين). In Arabic, the word means "luminous"'. In Ireland and Scotland, 'Noreen' is the anglicized version of 'Nóirín', which is the diminutive of 'Nora'.

External links
 Jerry Proc's page on Noreen
 Noreen on Crypto Museum website

Noreen